Qasemabad-e Tehranchi (also Romanized as Qāsemābād-e Tehrānchī; also known as Qāsemābād) is a village in Khavaran-e Gharbi Rural District of Khavaran District of Ray County, Tehran province, Iran. At the 2006 National Census, its population was 2,281 in 531 households, when it was in Qaleh Now Rural District of Kahrizak District. The following census in 2011 counted 1,933 people in 510 households, by which time Khavaran District had formed and was divided into two rural districts. The latest census in 2016 showed a population of 2,645 people in 732 households; it was the largest village in its rural district.

References 

Ray County, Iran

Populated places in Tehran Province

Populated places in Ray County, Iran